Mikko Aarni (born 31 May 1981) is a Finnish former bandy forward.

Career
Aarni was brought up by Tornio PV and moved to Kalix Bandy in 2004. In 2006, he joined Sandvikens AIK.

International career
Aarni was part of the gold-winning Finnish national bandy team at the Bandy World Championship 2004.

References

External links
 
 

Finnish bandy players
Living people
1981 births
Tornio PV players
Kalix BF players
Sandvikens AIK players
Bandy World Championship-winning players
Expatriate bandy players in Sweden